Tevita Lavemaau is a Tongan politician and Member of the Legislative Assembly of Tonga.

Lavemaau was first elected at the 2014 Tongan general election and appointed Minister of Revenue and Customs. Following the resignation of ʻAisake Eke in March 2017 he was appointed Minister of Finance.

In September 2017 he and Deputy Prime Minister Siaosi Sovaleni were sacked for disloyalty for supporting King Tupou VI's decision to sack the Prime Minister, dissolve Parliament and call new elections. He was re-elected at the 2017 election, but not reappointed to Cabinet.

In 2019 following the death of ʻAkilisi Pōhiva he was appointed to the cabinet of Pohiva Tuʻiʻonetoa as Minister for Finance, Minister for Revenue and Customs and Minister responsible for Statistics.

He lost his seat in the 2021 Tongan general election.

References

Living people
Members of the Legislative Assembly of Tonga
Finance Ministers of Tonga
Government ministers of Tonga
Year of birth missing (living people)